The Shire of Derby–West Kimberley is one of four local government areas in the Kimberley region of northern Western Australia, covering an area of , most of which is sparsely populated. The Shire's population as at the 2016 Census was almost 8,000, with most residing in the major towns of Derby, which is also the Shire's seat of government, and Fitzroy Crossing. There are also around 70 Aboriginal communities within the Shire.

The major industries of the shire include sheep and cattle for export, fishing, and tourism.

History

It was established as the West Kimberley Road District on 10 February 1887. The first Broome Road District separated on 15 November 1901 and the Municipality of Broome separated on 30 September 1904, but were re-absorbed on 24 July 1908 and 13 December 1918 respectively; the Broome area then again separated as the second Broome Road District (now the Shire of Broome) on 20 December 1918.

It was declared a shire and named the Shire of West Kimberley with effect from 1 July 1961 following the passage of the Local Government Act 1960, which reformed all remaining road districts into shires. It was renamed the Shire of Derby–West Kimberley on 11 June 1983.

The area is home to many large cattle stations, One of the first established was Yeeda Station, taken up in 1880 by the Murray Squatting Company composed of William Paterson, G. Paterson, H. Cornish and Alexander Richardson.

The station was established in 1886 when cattle arrived from the eastern states to stock the lease.

Other properties in the area include Mount Barnett Station, Cherrabun, Charnley River Station, Glenroy, Gogo, Kimberley Downs, Liveringa, Meda, Mornington, Mount Hart, Mount House, Myroodah and Noonkanbah Station all of which are cattle stations supplying the beef market.

Parts of the shire area have been included in the West Kimberley heritage assessment area.

Elected council
All nine councillors represent the whole of the Shire.

Towns and localities
The towns and localities of the Shire of Derby-West Kimberley with population and size figures based on the most recent Australian census:

(* indicates locality is only partially located within this shire)

Indigenous communities
Indigenous communities in the Shire of Derby-West Kimberley:
 Yungngora Community
 Looma Community

Notable councillors
 John McLarty, West Kimberley Roads Board chairman 1884; later a state MP

Heritage-listed places

As of 2023, 100 places are heritage-listed in the Shire of Derby–West Kimberley, of which 20 are on the State Register of Heritage Places.

References

External links
 
  . Department of Indigenous Affairs (DIA).

Derby